Bastion Peak is a 2,994 meter mountain summit located on the shared border of Jasper National Park in Alberta, and Mount Robson Provincial Park in British Columbia, Canada. It is situated in the Tonquin Valley in the Canadian Rockies. It was named in 1916 by Édouard-Gaston Deville because it has an appearance similar to that of a bastion on a castle. Its nearest higher peak is Turret Mountain,  to the west, and its greater parent is Mount Geikie  to the west.

Climate

Based on the Köppen climate classification, Bastion Peak is located in a subarctic climate with cold, snowy winters, and mild summers.

See also
List of peaks on the Alberta–British Columbia border
Mountains of Alberta
Mountains of British Columbia

References

External links
 National Park Service web site: Jasper National Park
 Provincial Park web site: Mount Robson Provincial Park
 Flickr photo: Bastion Peak (left)

Bastion Peak
Bastion Peak
Canadian Rockies